The 2018–19 FA Cup qualifying rounds open the 138th season of competition in England for The Football Association Challenge Cup (FA Cup), the world's oldest association football single knockout competition. A total of 736 teams were accepted for the competition, one fewer than the previous year's 737. 

The large number (644) of non-League teams entering the tournament, from (Levels 5 to 10) in the English football pyramid, required the competition to start with six rounds of preliminary (2) and qualifying (4) knockout matches. The 32 winning teams from the Fourth qualifying round progressed to the First Round Proper, where League teams tiered at Levels 3 and 4 entered the competition.

Calendar
The calendar for the 2018–19 FA Cup qualifying rounds, as announced by The Football Association.

Extra preliminary round
The Extra preliminary round fixtures were played on Friday 10, Saturday 11 and Sunday 12 August 2018; replays were to take place no later than Thursday 16 August 2018. The draw was held on Friday 6 July 2018. A total of 368 teams, from Level 8, Level 9 and Level 10 of English football, entered at this stage of the competition. The round included 80 teams from Level 10 of English football, the lowest ranked clubs to compete in the tournament.

Preliminary round
The Preliminary round fixtures were played on Friday 24, Saturday 25, Sunday 26 and Monday 27 August 2018; replays were to take place no later than Thursday 6 September 2018. The draw was held on 6 July 2018. A total of 320 clubs took part in this stage of the competition, including the 184 winners from the Extra preliminary round and 136 new clubs: 120 remaining clubs from Level 8 (all except Bracknell Town and Guernsey) and 16 clubs (those, who were promoted from level 8) from Level 7 of English football. The round included 32 teams from Level 10, the lowest-ranked teams still in the competition.

First qualifying round
The First qualifying round fixtures were to be played on Friday 7, Saturday 8 and Sunday 9 September 2018; replays no later than Thursday 13 September 2018. The draw was held on 28 August 2018. A total of 232 teams took part in this stage of the competition, including the 160 winners from the Preliminary round and 72 entering at this stage from the four divisions at Level 7 (all except those who were promoted from level 8) of English football. The round included eight teams from Level 10, the lowest-ranked teams still in the competition.

Second qualifying round
The Second qualifying round fixtures were played on Saturday 22 and Sunday 23 September 2018; the last replay played on Thursday 7 October 2018. The draw was held on 10 September 2018. A total of 160 teams took part in this stage of the competition, including the 116 winners from the First qualifying round and 44 entering at this stage from two divisions at Level 6 of English football. The round included Anstey Nomads, Atherstone Town and Burnham from Level 10, the lowest-ranked teams still in the competition.

Third qualifying round
The Third qualifying round fixtures were to be played on Saturday 6 October 2018 with all replays completed by Thursday 11 October 2018. The draw took place on 24 September 2018. The 80 winning teams from the Second qualifying round took part in this stage of the competition and no additional teams entered at this stage. The round included Dunston UTS, from Level 9 of the football pyramid as the lowest-ranked team still in the competition.

Fourth qualifying round
The Fourth qualifying round fixtures were played on Saturday 20 October 2018 with all replays completed by Thursday 25 October 2018. The draw took place on 8 October 2018. A total of 64 teams took part in this stage of the competition: the 40 winners from the Third qualifying round and the 24 members of the National League who entered at this stage, representing Level 5 of English football. The round included Dunston UTS from Level 9 of the football pyramid, the lowest-ranked team still in the competition.

Competition proper

32 winners from the Fourth qualifying round advance to the First Round Proper, where 48 teams from League One (Level 3) and League Two (Level 4) of English football, operating in the English Football League, enter the competition.

Broadcasting rights
The qualifying rounds aren't covered by the FA Cup's broadcasting contracts held by BBC Sport and BT Sport, although one game per round will be broadcast by the BBC on its media platforms.

The following qualifying rounds matches were broadcast live in the UK:

References

External links
 The FA Cup

qualifying rounds
FA Cup qualifying rounds